The 1989 Lion Cup was the seventh edition of the Lion Cup, the premier domestic rugby union knock-out competition in South Africa.

Teams
All 26 South African provincial teams took part in this competition. They were ranked as follows:

Competition

This competition was a knock-out competition. The four teams ranked 23 to 26 played each other in the Qualifying Round with the two winners advancing to Round One, where they  joined the teams ranked 9 to 22. These sixteen teams played in eight matches, with the winners advancing to Round Two, where the top 8 ranked teams will join. In Round Two, the sixteen remaining teams would be reduced to eight and would be followed by the quarter finals, semi-finals and the Final.

Fixtures and results

The fixtures were as follows:

Qualifying round

Round one

Round two

Quarter-finals

Semi-finals

Final

See also
 1989 Currie Cup Division A
 1989 Currie Cup Division B
 1989 Santam Bank Trophy Division A
 1989 Santam Bank Trophy Division B

References

1989
1989 in South African rugby union
1989 rugby union tournaments for clubs